Cryoturris fargoi is a species of sea snail, a marine gastropod mollusk in the family Mangeliidae.

Description
The length of the shell varies between 6 mm and 18 mm.

Distribution
C. fargoi can be found in Atlantic waters, ranging from the coast of North Carolina south to Florida, the Bahamas, Colombia and Brazil. in the Caribbean Sea and the Gulf of Mexico.

References

 McGinty, Thomas L. "New marine mollusks from Florida." Proceedings of the Academy of Natural Sciences of Philadelphia (1955): 75–85.
 G., F. Moretzsohn, and E. F. García. 2009. Gastropoda (Mollusca) of the Gulf of Mexico, Pp. 579–699 in Felder, D.L. and D.K. Camp (eds.), Gulf of Mexico–Origins, Waters, and Biota. Biodiversity. Texas A&M Press, College Station, Texas

External links
 
  Tucker, J.K. 2004 Catalog of recent and fossil turrids (Mollusca: Gastropoda). Zootaxa 682:1-1295.

fargoi